Machchhegaun is a town and municipality in Kavrepalanchok District in the Bagmati Zone of central Nepal. At the time of the 1991 Nepal census it had a population of 5,951 in 979 individual households.

References

Populated places in Kathmandu District